Lankeys Creek is a rural community in the east part of the Riverina.  It is situated by road, about 18 kilometres north west of Jingellic and 36 kilometres south east of Holbrook.

Lankeys Creek Post Office was open briefly in 1890, reopened in 1906 and closed in 1961.

Climate 

Being the first of the higher ground on the South West Slopes in a westerly wind, Lankeys Creek experiences cool maximum temperatures relative to its altitude (particularly in winter), averaging just  in July.

Notes and references

Towns in the Riverina
Towns in New South Wales